Nathan Shirley was a state legislator in Mississippi.

He served in the Mississippi Senate from 1874 to 1879. He served as a constable in Chickasaw County

The results of a state senate election between him and J. F. Griffin were disputed.

He served with F. H. Little and the R. O. Reynolds from Chickasaw County. He was succeeded by J. T. Griffin.

See also
 African-American officeholders during and following the Reconstruction era

References

Mississippi state senators
19th-century American politicians